Jefferson R. Moss (born June 4, 1976) is an American entrepreneur and politician who has served in the Utah House of Representatives from the 2nd district since January 1, 2017. He currently serves as the Majority Whip in the House, a position he has held since November 9, 2021 when his predecessor in that office, Mike Schultz became the Majority Leader following the abrupt resignation of Francis Gibson from the legislature.

Early life and education 
Moss is a native of Orem, Utah. He earned a Bachelor of Arts degree in political science from Brigham Young University and a Master of Business Administration in entrepreneurship and finance from the Marriott School of Business at BYU.

Career 
Jefferson Moss is the associate vice president and foundation COO at Utah Valley University. He is also a member of the Utah State Board of Education. He formerly worked as a wealth management advisor at Credit Suisse and as a wealth advisor at KeyBank.

Moss serves as House majority whip. He is a member of the Executive Appropriations Committee, Public Education Appropriations Subcommittee, House Business and Labor Committee, and the Legislative Management Committee.

Personal life 
resides in Saratoga Springs, Utah, with his wife and four children.

References

1976 births
Living people
Republican Party members of the Utah House of Representatives
People from Saratoga Springs, Utah
21st-century American politicians